An investment rating of a real estate property measures the property’s risk-adjusted returns, relative to a completely risk-free asset. Mathematically, a property’s investment rating is the return a risk-free asset would have to yield to be termed as good an investment as the property whose rating is being calculated. The underlying drivers for property ratings are the dividends (net operating income) and capital gains over a certain holding period, and their associated risks or variances. Similar to other financial ratings developed for mutual funds and stocks, it can be assumed that investors have constant relative risk aversion over the wealth derived from other sources and from their investments.  For simplicity, it can also be assumed that the investment return is not correlated with other sources of wealth but represents 100% of the investor's wealth. A property’s investment rating is then a transformation of the risk-adjusted averaged return to a single number that conveys the property’s long-term potential to yield profits.

Home as an investment asset

Adam Smith wrote in The Wealth of Nations over 200 years ago that "a dwelling-house, as such, contributes nothing to the revenue of its inhabitants".  The Economist has reported that most Americans were treating their homes as an investment till 2008. The traditional belief that home ownership is a necessary milestone to acquiring wealth still holds.  Not everyone considers their home as a long-term Property investment asset ; some believe they can get better returns in other assets . By owning a home to live in, the owner not only saves on rent but also benefits from any long-term price appreciation. And investors, those that buy a home to rent out, are in it primarily for financial gains, be it monthly cash flow income, long-term gain, or a combination of both. But, investors and live-in home owners alike should care for the net returns a home can yield, since it is, for most, the single largest investment they will ever make.

Rating evaluation

Objective evaluation of a property's intrinsic long-term "worth", requires a rating process as mature as the process for stocks and funds. Knowing a property's current market price is necessary, but not sufficient, especially in uncertain times.

There are hundreds of macro and micro factors that could potentially impact a property's financial returns, including price appreciation, ability to put it on rent, and vacancy, fair market value, mortgage, maintenance expenses, property tax, property management fee (if any), and home insurance. Add on top attributes that span markets, housing, government, community, demographic and lifestyle parameters.  A sound rating analysis should cover all aspects of location – national, state, metro, county, city, tracts down to neighborhoods and the property itself. One should be able to measure and factor in the inherent risk/volatility in all of these attributes to arrive at a measure that can be correlated to a financially sound decision on the next home purchase

No one has a crystal ball, of course. So, any rating of this nature should be interpreted as a 'relative' measure, and used as a way to rank/compare homes for their relative investment potential. In other words, a highly rated home is likely to outperform a low-rated home. So, homes in the top quartile are most likely to outperform all other homes.

Advantages of real estate rating
 Investors
 Locate best places to invest
 Identify properties with the most value
 Provide objective criteria to establishes the right price range
 Compute rent income to expect
 Project expected long-term cash flow and appreciation
 Sellers and listing agents
 Calculate best price for rapid sale
 Help in expanding properties market to national buyers pool
 Differentiate values of properties
 Build confidence in the value of a transaction
 Lenders
 Establish collateral value (both current & future)  of a property
 Assess potential loss in a foreclosure
 Simplify decision to either foreclose or modify a loan

Rating systems
  InvestMarq.com CashflowScore
 FinestExpert.com FE-Score
 Case–Shiller home price index
 Morningstar for funds and stocks:
 Paper
 Fitch rating for residential mortgage backed securities
 Myrealestateteam.net
 S&P Ratings
 Commercial mortgage-based securities
 S&P direct property fund ratings: forward-looking qualitative assessment
 Country investment ratings: Shows the countries where buy-to-let property earns the highest returns
 ConsumerReports investment ratings

References

See also
 Real Estate Appraisal
 Investment Grade Net Lease Credit Tenants
 My Real Estate Team
 Property Investment Calculator

Real estate valuation
Real estate investing